Pendilla de Arbas is a locality and minor local entity located in the municipality of Villamanín, in León province, Castile and León, Spain. As of 2020, it has a population of 22.

Geography 
Pendilla de Arbas is located 59km north-northwest of León, Spain.

References

Populated places in the Province of León